Petenia splendida, the bay snook, is a species of cichlid from Mexico and northern Central America. It is important to local commercial fisheries.

Description
This piscivorous species can reach a length of  SL. These fishes have a laterally compressed body, with an elongated head and a prominent jaw. The fins are large and rounded. The basic coloration varies from pale pink to deep red to gold. Males are a bit larger than females, with a more accentuated red coloration. Females are usually rounder. The special feature of this species is in the jaws that are extensible to more than 1/4 of the length of the entire body, which allows to prey fishes of considerable size but also to suck small fishes directly into the mouth.

Distribution and habitat
This species is native to the Atlantic slope of tropical Mexico, Guatemala and Belize.  It prefers slower-moving areas of rivers and lakes.

Bibliography

 Eschmeyer, William N., ed. 1998. Catalog of Fishes. Special Publication of the Center for Biodiversity Research and Information, núm. 1, vol. 1–3. California Academy of Sciences. San Francisco, California, USA. 2905. .
 Fenner, Robert M.: The Conscientious Marine Aquarist. Neptune City, New Jersey, USA : T.F.H. Publications, 2001.
 Helfman, G., B. Collette y D. Facey: The diversity of fishes. Blackwell Science, Malden, Massachusetts, USA, 1997.
 Hoese, D.F. 1986: . A M.M. Smith y P.C. Heemstra (eds.) Smiths' sea fishes. Springer-Verlag, Berlin, Germany.
 Maugé, L.A. 1986.  A J. Daget, J.-P. Gosse y D.F.E. Thys van den Audenaerde (eds.) Check-list of the freshwater fishes of Africa (CLOFFA). ISNB, Brussels; MRAC, Tervuren; y ORSTOM, Paris, France. Vol. 2.
 Moyle, P. y J. Cech.: Fishes: An Introduction to Ichthyology, 4th. Ed., Upper Saddle River, New Jersey, USA: Prentice-Hall.
 Nelson, J.: Fishes of the World, 3rd ed. New York, USA: John Wiley and Sons.
 Wheeler, A.: The World Encyclopedia of Fishes, 2nd. Ed., London: Macdonald.

References

External links
Petenia splendida - picture gallery
 Catalogue of Life 
  AQUATAB

Heroini
Fish of Central America
Fish of Guatemala
Fish described in 1862
Taxa named by Albert Günther